The 2022 Sandwell Metropolitan Borough Council election took place on 5 May 2022 to elect members of Sandwell Metropolitan Borough Council. This was on the same day as other local elections. 24 of the 72 seats were up for election.

Background
Sandwell is a consistently Labour council. Labour have held majorities every election since its creation in 1973, apart from 1978 when the Conservatives gained the council. From 2018 to 2021, Sandwell was one of the few councils to be comprised fully of 1 party, with Labour in control of all 72 wards. In the 2021 election, Labour lost 9 seats with 53.1% of the vote, the Conservatives gained 9 with 36.6%, and independents did not make any gains or losses with 4.6% of the vote.

The seats up for election this year were last elected in 2018. In that election, Labour won all seats with 68.5% of the vote, giving them full control of the council. The Conservatives won 24.4%.

Previous council composition 

Changes:
 November 2021: Rajbir Singh (Labour) resigns from council; seat left vacant until 2022 election
 January 2022: Ian Chambers joins Labour from the Conservatives
 April 2022: Iqbal Singh Padda joins Conservatives from Labour
 Independent councillors Yvonne Davies and Joanne Hadley form Sandwell Together

Results

Results by ward
An asterisk indicates an incumbent councillor.

Abbey

Blackheath

Bristnall

Charlemont with Grove Vale

Cradley Heath and Old Hill

Friar Park

Great Barr with Yew Tree

Great Bridge

Greets Green and Lyng

Hateley Heath

Langley

Newton

Old Warley

Oldbury

Princes End

Rowley

Smethwick

Soho and Victoria

St. Paul's

Tipton Green

Tividale

Wednesbury North

Wednesbury South

West Bromwich Central

References

Sandwell
Sandwell Council elections